The 60th season of the Campeonato Gaúcho kicked off on June 29, 1980, and ended on November 23, 1980. Sixteen teams participated. Grêmio won their 22nd title. Esportivo, Farroupilha, Gaúcho, Grêmio Bagé, Lajeadense and Pelotas were relegated.

Participating teams 

In early 1980, It was decided that the championship would be reduced from 20 teams to 14. To that goal, the Copa Governador do Estado was turned into a qualification tournament for the 1980 First Level, with the presence of all the teams that would have participated under the 20 teams configuration that weren't participating in any national division (except for Riograndense, which had withdrawn and was replaced by São José), with the Seven best teams qualifying to it. However, after that tournament ended, the eight and ninth-placed teams were included in the First level as well, sparking protests from the other four clubs that had participated, who subsequently withdrew from disputing the Second level that year.

System 
The championship would have two stages.:

 First phase: The sixteen clubs played each other in a double round-robin system. The six best teams qualified to the Final phase, with the best teams in each round earning one bonus point. the bottom six teams in the sum of both rounds were relegated.
 Final phase: The six remaining teams played each other in a double round-robin system; the team with the most points won the title.

Championship

First phase

First round

Second round

Final standings

Final phase

Taça de Bronze Selective Tournament 

This tournament was disputed by all the First level teams that hadn't qualified to either the Taça de Ouro or the Taça de Bronze. It would be played in a double round-robin formst, with the winner qualifying to the Taça de Bronze.

References 

Campeonato Gaúcho seasons
Gaúcho